Mohamed Ramadan (Arabic محمد رمضان); born (September 11, 1970) is an Egyptian former football striker. He was the top scorer of Egyptian Premier League (1990–91) with 14 goals playing for Al-Ahly.

International career

Mohamed Ramadan was a member of the Egypt national football team in 1994 African Cup of Nations.

Titles and honours
 Top scorer in Egyptian Premier League (1990–91) with 14 goals.

References

External links
 
 
 

1970 births
Living people
Egyptian footballers
Egypt international footballers
1988 African Cup of Nations players
1994 African Cup of Nations players
Association football forwards
Egyptian Premier League players
Tersana SC players
Al Ahly SC players